Halimochirurgus is a small genus of spikefishes native to the deep waters of the Indian and western Pacific Oceans.

Species
There are currently 2 recognized species in this genus:
 Halimochirurgus alcocki M. C. W. Weber, 1913
 Halimochirurgus centriscoides Alcock, 1899 (Longsnout spikefish)

References

Tetraodontiformes
Marine fish genera
Taxa named by Alfred William Alcock